Andy Barron (born January 9, 1983) is a photographer best known for his work with the bands Switchfoot and Foster the People, whom he has toured with regularly. He is currently on tour with Chris Stapleton working as their official photographer.

Barron graduated from Biola University with a B.S. degree in Art/Graphic design, where he worked on the student newspaper and as the Associated Students' graphic designer. He got to know Switchfoot when he shot them for the school paper and then met with Chad Butler afterwards at the In-N-Out near the Biola campus, and Butler wanted to see more of the photos he had taken.

His work has been featured in many publications, including Rolling Stone, USA Today, Paste, Relevant Magazine (cover), Pollstar (cover), spin.com, mtv.com, and many others.

His official website is andybarron.com.

References

1983 births
Biola University alumni
American photographers
Living people